HMS Fantome was the lead ship of the s built for the Royal Navy in the mid-1870s.

Bibliography

 

 

Fantome-class sloops
Ships built in Pembroke Dock
1873 ships
Victorian-era sloops of the United Kingdom